Elizabeth Hand (born March 29, 1957) is an American writer.

Life and career
Hand grew up in Yonkers and Pound Ridge, New York. She studied drama and anthropology at The Catholic University of America. Since 1988, Hand has lived in coastal Maine, the setting for many of her stories, and as of 2017 lives in Lincolnville. She also lives part-time in Camden Town, London which has been the setting for Mortal Love and the short story "Cleopatra Brimstone".

Hand's first story, "Prince of Flowers", was published in 1988 in Twilight Zone magazine, and her first novel, Winterlong, was published in 1990. With Paul Witcover, she created and wrote DC Comics' 1990s cult series Anima. Hand's other works include Aestival Tide (1992); Icarus Descending (1993); Waking the Moon (1994), which won the Tiptree Award and the Mythopoeic Fantasy Award; the post-apocalyptic novel Glimmering (1997); contemporary fantasy Black Light (1999), a New York Times Notable Book; the historical fantasy Mortal Love (2004), a Washington Post Notable Book; the psychological thriller Generation Loss (2007), and the World Fantasy Award-winning "The Maiden Flight of McCauley's Bellerophon". Her story collections are Last Summer at Mars Hill (1998) (which includes the Nebula and World Fantasy award-winning title novella); Bibliomancy (2002), winner of the World Fantasy Award; and  Saffron and Brimstone: Strange Stories, which includes the Nebula Award-winning "Echo" (2006). Mortal Love was also shortlisted for the 2005 Mythopoeic Fantasy Award for Adult Literature.

Among Hand's other recent short fiction, "Pavane for a Prince of the Air" (2002) and "Cleopatra Brimstone" (2001) won International Horror Guild Awards. Most recently, she won the Shirley Jackson Award for Generation Loss and the World Fantasy Award in 2008 for Illyria, and the Inkpot Award in 2018.

She also writes movie and television spin-offs, including Star Wars tie-in novels and novelizations of such films as The X-Files and 12 Monkeys. She contributed a Bride of Frankenstein novel to the recent series of classic movie monster novels published by Dark Horse Comics.

One of Hand's themes from the Winterlong saga is the remorseless exploitation of animal and plant species to create what she calls "geneslaves."  Examples include a three-hundred-year-old genetically reconstructed and cerebrally augmented Basilosaurus by the name of Zalophus; the aardmen, hybrids of dog and man; hydrapithecenes, human-fish or human-cuttlefish hybrids somewhat resembling Davy Jones and his crew from the Pirates of the Caribbean film series; and sagittals, whelks genetically engineered to be worn as a bracelet and, when its host feels threatened or agitated, extrude a spine laced with a deadly neurotoxin.

Hand is a longtime reviewer and critic for The Washington Post, Los Angeles Times, Boston Review, Salon, and Village Voice, among others.  She also writes a regular review column for the Magazine of Fantasy and Science Fiction.

Bibliography

Novels
 1988 Winterlong – 
 1992  Aestival Tide – 
 1993 Icarus Descending – 
 1994 Waking the Moon (longer UK edition) – 
 1995 Waking the Moon (US edition preferred by the author ) – 
 1997 Glimmering (second edition 2012) – 
 1999 Black Light – 
 2000 "Chip Crockett's Christmas Carol" in Sci Fiction
 2002 "Cleopatra Brimstone" in Redshift
 2003 "The Least Trumps" in Conjunctions 39: The New Wave Fabulists
 2004 Mortal Love – 
 2006 Chip Crockett's Christmas Carol (illustrated by Judith Clute; originally published December 2000) – . The story is a tribute to entertainers Sandy Becker and Joey Ramone. An online edition of Chip Crockett's Christmas Carol was serialized by Hand on her Livejournal community "theinferior4".
 2006 Illyria – , 
 2007 The Bride of Frankenstein (media tie-in) – 
 2012 Radiant Days
 2015 Wylding Hall (novella)
 2019 Curious Toys
 2020 The Book of Lamps and Banners
 2022  Hokuloa Road

Cass Neary Crime Novels
 2007 Generation Loss – 
 2012 Available Dark – 
 2016 Hard Light – 
 2022 The Book of Lamps and Banners –

Star Wars Expanded Universe
 2003 Boba Fett: Maze Of Deception – 
 2003 Boba Fett: Hunted – 
 2004 Boba Fett: A New Threat – 
 2004 Boba Fett: Pursuit –

Adaptations
 1995 12 Monkeys – 
 1997 Millennium: The Frenchman – 
 1998 The X-Files: Fight the Future – 
 1999 Anna and the King – 
 2001 The Affair of the Necklace – 
 2004 Catwoman –

Short fiction 
Collections
 1998 Last Summer at Mars Hill – 
 2003 Bibliomancy – 
 2006 Saffron and Brimstone: Strange Stories – 
 2012 Errantry – 
Stories

 1990 "Jangletown" (with Paul Witcover; in The Further Adventures of The Joker)
 1993 "Lucifer Over Lancaster" (with Paul Witcover; in The Further Adventures of Superman)
 1994 "The Erl-King"

Book reviews

Footnotes

External links

 

 Elizabeth Hand at Free Speculative Fiction Online
 Interview at Strange Horizons
 The Fantastic Spectrum of Elizabeth Hand (interview), Clarkesworld Magazine, November 2009
 Interview at Tor.com, August 24, 2010
 

 

1957 births
Living people
20th-century American novelists
21st-century American novelists
American science fiction writers
American women short story writers
American women novelists
American speculative fiction critics
Nebula Award winners
World Fantasy Award-winning writers
Science fiction critics
Catholic University of America alumni
Women science fiction and fantasy writers
Novelists from New York (state)
Writers from Maine
People from Yonkers, New York
People from Pound Ridge, New York
20th-century American women writers
21st-century American women writers
The Magazine of Fantasy & Science Fiction people
20th-century American short story writers
21st-century American short story writers
People from Lincolnville, Maine
American women non-fiction writers
20th-century American non-fiction writers
21st-century American non-fiction writers
Weird fiction writers
Inkpot Award winners